The 1903 Yukon general election was held on January 13, 1903. The council was expanded to elect five of the ten members to the Yukon Territorial Council. The election was fought along party lines even though the council was limited in its powers and played an advisory role to the federally appointed Commissioner.

Distribution
The Yukon was divided up into three electoral districts by the Yukon Territorial Council. The two rural districts were named Districts No. 1 and No 2. and each elected two members while Whitehorse became its own electoral district, electing just one.

After the election the validity of the election was called into question because the Yukon council might have overstepped its authority dividing up the Yukon into electoral districts.

Results

|- style="background:#ccc;"
! rowspan="2" colspan="2" style="text-align:center;"|Affiliation
!rowspan="2"|Candidates
! colspan="3" style="text-align:center;"|Elected members
!colspan="3" style="text-align:center;"|Popular vote
|- style="background:#ccc;"
| style="text-align:center;"|1900
| style="text-align:center;"|1903
| style="text-align:center;"|Change
| style="text-align:center;"|#
| style="text-align:center;"|%
| style="text-align:center;"|Change (pp)

|align="right"|4
|align="right"|0
|align="right"|2
|align="right"|n/a 
|align="right"|1,880
|align="right"|32.19%
|align="right"|n/a

|align="right"|2
|align="right"|n/a
|align="right"|1
|align="right"|n/a 
|align="right"|1,092
|align="right"|18.70%
|align="right"|n/a

|align="right"|1
|align="right"|n/a
|align="right"|0
|align="right"|n/a
|align="right"|367
|align="right"|6.28%
|align="right"|n/a

|align="right"|9
|align="right"|n/a
|align="right"|2
|align="right"|n/a
|align="right"|2,501
|align="right"|42.83%
|align="right"|n/a
|-
|- style="background:#EAECF0;"
| style="text-align:left;" colspan="2"|Total
| style="text-align:right;"|16
| style="text-align:right;"|2
| style="text-align:right;"|5
| style="text-align:right;"|5
| style="text-align:right;"|5,840
| style="text-align:right;"|100%
| style="text-align:right;"|
|}

Members elected

References

Elections in Yukon
1903 elections in Canada
1903 in Yukon
January 1903 events